Early Music (Lachrymæ Antiquæ) is a studio album by the Kronos Quartet, containing 21 compositions, many of which were written, arranged, or transcribed for the quartet.  The subtitle is from Dowland's Lachrimae, or Seaven Teares of 1604.

Compositions
The album contrasts adaptations for string quartet of music from the Middle Ages and early Renaissance with 20th-century compositions. The earliest piece is by the ninth-century Byzantine abbess, poet and composer Kassia; the most recent pieces are by the twentieth-century composers John Cage, Alfred Schnittke, and Arvo Pärt. Arranging and selecting compositions from ten centuries of music was intended, according to David Harrington, the quartet's founder, "to find a way of relating vastly different pieces to one time, to find a place in time where the elements meet." Harrington described the contrast between old and new music as crucial to the quartet: "There are moments when the music could have come out of the Middle Ages; there are other moments when it sounds like it's coming out of the Vietnam War, let's say.  That contrast is something we've been working with for a long time." Allan Kozinn, writing in The New York Times, describes the album as a concept album in which "the distinctions between old and new are blurred, and the effect is comforting rather than disconcerting."

Instrumentation
As with many Kronos Quartet albums, the basic string quartet is augmented by various other, sometimes exotic instruments. The Swedish song "Längdans efter Byfåns Mats" features a bagpipe, and the traditional Swedish bridal march "Brudmarsch frå Östa" includes a nyckelharpa (a string instrument related to the hurdy-gurdy). Chinese virtuoso musician Wu Man plays two kinds of ruan (a plucked lute-like string instrument) on "Lachrymæ Antiquæ." Perhaps the most exotic instrumentation is found on "Uleg-Khem", a traditional Tuvan song, where the quartet is accompanied by the Tuvan throat singers  of Huun-Huur-Tu, who also play igil (a bowed string-instrument), bysaanchi (a cello-like instrument), and doshpuluur (a lyre-like instrument).

Critical reception

Rick Anderson on Allmusic praises the album's "overriding mood...of sadness and devotion...Like most of Kronos' best work, this is dark, lovely, eerie stuff." The Jerusalem Post called it one of the most intriguing Kronos albums to date. Allan Kozinn featured it as a Critic's Choice in The New York Times.

Track listing

Personnel

Musicians
David Harrington – violin
John Sherba – violin
Hank Dutt – viola
Joan Jeanrenaud – cello

Additional musicians
Marja Mutru – harmonium (1, 9, 15)
David Lamb – bagpipe (3)
Wu Man – ruan (4)
Olov Johansson – nyckelharpa (10)
Judith Sherman – drum (12)
Huun-Huur-Tu (18):
Kaigal-ool Khovalyg – vocals, igil
Anatoly Kuular – vocals, bysaanchi
Kongar-ol Ondar – vocals, doshpuluur

See also
List of 1997 albums

References

1997 classical albums
Kronos Quartet albums
Nonesuch Records albums